Abil (also spelled Abel or Aabel) is a village in central Syria, administratively part of the Homs Governorate, located 10 kilometers south of Homs. Nearby localities include al-Nuqayrah and Kafr Aya to the north, Maskanah to the northeast, Judaydat al-Sharqiyah to the east, Shinshar to the southeast, Damina al-Sharqiyah to the south, al-Buwaydah al-Sharqiyah to the southwest and Qattinah to the west. According to the Syria Central Bureau of Statistics (CBS), Abil had a population of 2,873 in the 2004 census. Its inhabitants are predominantly Sunni Muslims.

Abil is identified the Roman era settlement of Abila Lysaniae. The medieval Syrian geographer Yaqut al-Hamawi visited the village in the 1220s, noting it was "A village of Hims, lying near the city, to the south, and about 2 miles distant."

References

Bibliography

Populated places in Homs District